Major-General William Henry Snyder Nickerson,  (27 March 1875, Dorchester, New Brunswick – 1954), was a Canadian recipient of the Victoria Cross, the highest and most prestigious award for gallantry in the face of the enemy that can be awarded to British and Commonwealth forces.

Victoria Cross
Nickerson was a 25 years old lieutenant in the Royal Army Medical Corps, of the British Army, attached to the Mounted Infantry during the Second Boer War when his actions at Wakkerstroom led to the award of the Victoria Cross. His citation reads:

Further military service
Following the end of the war in South Africa in June 1902, Nickerson returned to the United Kingdom on board the SS Soudan, arriving in Southampton in September that year. He was then posted to Egypt.

He later achieved the rank of major general after service in World War I and was appointed Colonel-in-Chief of the RAMC in 1933.

Personal life
His family had returned to England when he was a child and he was educated at Portsmouth Grammar School, Manchester Grammar School and Owen's College, the forerunner of the University of Manchester graduating in medicine in 1896. He joined the RAMC in 1898.

His grave is in the private burial ground at his home in Cour, Kintyre, Scotland.

References

Monuments to Courage (David Harvey, 1999)
The Register of the Victoria Cross (This England, 1997)
Victoria Crosses of the Anglo-Boer War (Ian Uys, 2000)

External links
Location of grave and VC medal (Strathclyde)
Major General W.H.S. Nickerson
 
 Legion Magazine Article
 

1875 births
1954 deaths
Burials in Scotland
Canadian military personnel from New Brunswick
British Army generals
Royal Army Medical Corps officers
Canadian recipients of the Victoria Cross
Second Boer War recipients of the Victoria Cross
Companions of the Order of the Bath
Companions of the Order of St Michael and St George
Alumni of the University of Manchester
British Army personnel of the Second Boer War
British Army personnel of World War I
People educated at Manchester Grammar School
People educated at The Portsmouth Grammar School
People from Westmorland County, New Brunswick
British Army recipients of the Victoria Cross